N. bidentata may refer to:

 Naesa bidentata, an isopod crustacean
 Nerice bidentata, a North American moth